Thomas Boyd, 6th Lord Boyd (c. 1547–1611) was a Scottish noble and politician.

Biography
Thomas Boyd, with his father, Robert Boyd, 5th Lord Boyd, fought at the battle of Langside on 13 May 1568, for Mary, Queen of Scots. He inherited the title Lord Boyd on the death of 5th Lord Boyd in 1590. He resigned his whole estate to the King, from whom, on 12 January 1592, he obtained a new charter thereof, "erecting the same into a free Lordship and Barony, to be called the Lordship and Barony of Kilmarnock" to himself for life, with remainder to his son and heir apparent, Robert, Master of Boyd, in tail male, remainder to "heirs male," thereby excluding the heirs general. Under this grant Thomas, not improbably, became Lord Boyd of Kilmarnock. He died June 1611. As Robert died before his father, the estates and title passed to his son Robert.

Family
Thomas was the second but first surviving son and heir of Robert Boyd, 5th Lord Boyd.

Thomas Boyd married firstly, before 1568, when she was living, Margaret, 2nd daughter of Sir Matthew Campbell, of Loudoun, by Isabel, daughter of Sir John Drummond, of Innerpeffry. He married secondly to Jane daughter of William Stockdale. He married, lastly, to Elizabeth Wallace, who survived him.

His children included:
 Robert, Master of Boyd, (died 1597), who married Jean Kerr, a daughter of Mark Kerr, 1st Earl of Lothian. His children included Robert Boyd, 7th Lord Boyd and James Boyd, 9th Lord Boyd.
 Thomas Boyd of Bedlay
 Andrew Boyd, who was made bishop of Argyll in 1632.
 Marion Boyd, who married James Hamilton, 1st Earl of Abercorn (died 1632). She may have been the "Mistress of Paisley" attending Anne of Denmark at Stirling Castle with Margaret Seton, Lady Paisley in April 1603.
 Isabel Boyd, who married (1) John Blair younger of that ilk, (2) Dougal Campbell of Auchinbreck. Francis Hamilton the heir of Provan Hall had been contracted to marry her in 1607, and would later accuse her of witchcraft.
 Agnes Boyd, who married George Elphinstone of Blythswood, Provost of Glasgow in August 1600. As a wedding gift James VI of Scotland gave her a gold chain necklace and a gold belt set with pearls, and a pair of matching gold "garnishings" set with pearl to wear in her hair, worth £580 Scots. After spending a weekend in Glasgow with the newly weds at the end of August, James VI gave George Elphinstone land in the New Park of Partick to build a better house to entertain him in the next time.

Notes
Footnotes

Citations

References
Attribution

Further reading
 

1547 births
1611 deaths
16th-century Scottish peers
17th-century Scottish peers
Lords of Parliament (pre-1707)
Lords Boyd